Professor Benjamin Wan-Sang Wah is the Wei Lun Professor of Computer Science and Engineering at the Chinese University of Hong Kong, as well as the former provost of this university. He was elected President of IEEE Computer Society in 2001.

Education 
Wah was born in Hong Kong and graduated from Queen Elizabeth School, Hong Kong. He received his BS and MS in Electrical Engineering and Computer Science from Columbia University, USA, then furthered his studies at the University of California, Berkeley, obtaining an MS in Computer Science and a PhD in Databases. Wah began his teaching career in Purdue University in 1979. He later joined the University of Illinois, Urbana-Champaign, in 1985, which he served until his retirement at the end of 2011.

Career
In 1985-2011, he was the Franklin W. Woeltge Endowed Professor of Electrical and Computer Engineering at the University of Illinois, Urbana-Champaign, USA. In 2008-2009, he also served as Director of the Advanced Digital Sciences Center in Singapore, a US$50 million research center established by the University of Illinois in Singapore in collaboration with the Singapore government's Agency for Science, Technology and Research. In 1998–1999, Wah was Chair Professor of Computer Science and Engineering at The Chinese University of Hong Kong (CUHK), and in that year received an Exemplary Teaching Award. From 1999 to 2003, he served as Adjunct Professor in the Department of Computer Science and Engineering at CUHK.

Research
Wah is an expert on non-linear programming, multimedia signal processing and artificial intelligence. He has published numerous research articles in top professional journals, such as Artificial Intelligence, IEEE Trans. in Computers, IEEE Trans. on Knowledge and Data Engineering, IEEE Trans. on Multimedia, IEEE Trans. on Parallel and Distributed Technology, IEEE Trans. on Software Engineering, Journal of Global Optimization, Journal of Artificial Intelligence Research. He is also the author of two books, and Editor-in-Chief of Wiley's Encyclopedia of Computer Science and Engineering (published in 2008), and has contributed to many edited books and book chapters. He has served on many journal editorial boards.

He also holds many Endowed Professorships and Honorary Professorships in leading universities in the United States of America and in Asia. Professor Wah was elected President of IEEE Computer Society in 2001. He was a member of the Research Grants Council of Hong Kong between 2005 and 2009 and Chairman of its Engineering Panel between 2006 and 2009.  He has been a member of the HK Research Grants Council since 2011.

Awards 
Professor Wah has received numerous honors and awards for his distinguished academic and professional achievements, including the Tsutomu Kanai Award, the W. Wallace McDowell Award, and the Richard E. Merwin Distinguished Service Award, all from the IEEE Computer Society, the Pan Wen Yuan Foundation Outstanding Research Award, and the IEEE Third Millennium Medal. In 2011, he received the Distinguished Alumni Award in computer science from the University of California, Berkeley. He has been elected:  
Fellow of the American Association for the Advancement of Science,
Fellow of IEEE, 
Fellow of the Association for Computing Machinery.

References

press release by CUHK
Personal page, The Chinese University of Hong Kong
Wiley Encyclopedia of Computer Science and Engineering, 2009
Richard E. Merwin Distinguished Service Award, IEEE Computer Society

Fellow Members of the IEEE
Fellows of the American Association for the Advancement of Science
University of Illinois Urbana-Champaign faculty
Chinese electrical engineers
Living people
UC Berkeley College of Engineering alumni
Year of birth missing (living people)